Juan Carlos Blanco may refer to:

 Juan Carlos Blanco (volleyball) (born 1981), Venezuelan volleyball player
 Juan Carlos Blanco Fernández (1847–1910), Uruguayan politician
 Juan Carlos Blanco Acevedo (1879–1952), Uruguayan politician, son of Juan Carlos Blanco Fernández
 Juan Carlos Blanco Estradé (1934–2021), Uruguayan politician, grandson of Blanco Fernández and nephew of Blanco Acevedo
 Juan Carlos Blanco Peñalva (born 1946), Uruguayan football coach and former player, see Club Nacional de Football